Sarcosuchus is an extinct genus of crocodyliform and distant relative of living crocodilians that lived during the Early Cretaceous, from the late Hauterivian to the early Albian, 133 to 112 million years ago of what is now Africa and South America. The genus name comes from the Greek σάρξ (sarx) meaning flesh and σοῦχος (souchus) meaning crocodile. It is known from two species, S. imperator from the early Albian Elrhaz Formation of Niger and S. hartti from the Late Hauterivian of northeastern Brazil, other material is known from Morocco and Tunisia and possibly Libya and Mali.

The first remains were discovered during several expeditions led by the French paleontologist Albert-Félix de Lapparent, spanning from 1946 to 1959, in the Sahara. These remains were fragments of the skull, vertebrae, teeth, and scutes. In 1964, an almost complete skull was found in Niger by the French CEA, but it was not until 1997 and 2000 that most of its anatomy became known to science, when an expedition led by the American paleontologist Paul Sereno discovered six new specimens, including one with about half the skeleton intact and most of the spine.

Description 

It had somewhat telescoped eyes and a long snout comprising 75% of the length of the skull. There were 35 teeth in each side of the upper jaw, while in the lower jaw there were 31 teeth in each side. The upper jaw was also noticeably longer than the lower one leaving a gap between them when the jaws were shut, creating an overbite. In young individuals the shape of the snout resembled that of the living gharial but in fully grown individuals it became considerably broader.

Bulla 
Sarcosuchus has an expansion at the end of its snout known as a bulla, which has been compared with the ghara seen in gharials. However, unlike the ghara, which is only found in male gharial, the bulla is present in all Sarcosuchus skulls that have been found so far, suggesting that it was not a sexually dimorphic trait. The purpose of this structure is not known.

Osteoderms 

The osteoderms, also known as dermal scutes, of Sarcosuchus were similar to those goniopholodids like Sunosuchus and Goniopholis; they formed an uninterrupted surface that started in the posterior part of the neck up to the middle of the tail like is seen in Araripesuchus and other basal crocodyliforms, different from the pattern seen in living crocodiles, which present discontinuity between the osteoderms of the neck and body.

Size 

A common method to estimate the size of crocodiles and crocodile-like reptiles is the use of the length of the skull measured in the midline from the tip of the snout to the back of the skull table, since in living crocodilians there is a strong correlation between skull length and total body length in subadult and adult individuals irrespective of their sex, this method was used by Sereno et al. (2001) for Sarcosuchus due to the absence of a complete enough skeleton. This shows that Sarcosuchus was able to reach a maximum body size not only greater than previously estimated but also greater than that of the Miocene Rhamphosuchus, the Late Cretaceous Deinosuchus and the Miocene Purussaurus according to current estimates at that time.

However, extrapolation from the femur of a subadult individual as well as measurements of the skull width further showed that the largest S. imperator was significantly smaller than was estimated by Sereno et al. (2001) based on modern crocodilians. O’Brien et al.

Classification 
 
Sarcosuchus is commonly classified as part of the clade Pholidosauridae, a group of crocodile-like reptiles (Crocodyliformes) related but outside Crocodylia (the clade containing living crocodiles, alligators and gharials). Within this group it is most closely related to the North American genus Terminonaris. Most members of Pholidosauridae had long, slender snouts and they all were aquatic, inhabiting several different environments, some forms are interpreted as marine, capable of tolerating saltwater while others, like Sarcosuchus, were freshwater forms, the most primitive members of the clade, however, were found in coastal settings, zones of mixing of freshwater and marine waters. Sarcosuchus stands out among pholidosaurids for being considered a generalist predator, different from most known members of the clade which were specialized piscivores. A 2019 study found it to be in a more derived position in Tethysuchia, being phylogenetically closer to Dyrosauridae.

Simplified cladogram after Fortier et al. (2011).

Discovery and naming

Early findings 
  
During the course of several expeditions on the Sahara from 1946 to 1959 which were led by the French paleontologist Albert-Félix de Lapparent, several fossils of a crocodyliform of large size were unearthed in the region known as the Continental Intercalaire Formation. Some of them were found in Foggara Ben Draou, in Mali and near the town of Aoulef, Algeria (informally named as the Aoulef Crocodile) while others came from the Ain el Guettar Formation of Gara Kamboute. In the south of Tunisia, the fossils found were fragments of the skull, teeth, scutes and vertebrae. In 1957, in the region now known as the Elrhaz Formation, several isolated teeth of great size were found by H. Faure. The study of this material by French paleontologist France De Broin helped identify them as coming from a new long snouted crocodile.

Later, in 1964, the research team of the French CEA discovered an almost complete skull in the region of Gadoufaoua in the Niger. The said skull was shipped to Paris for study and became the holotype of the then new genus and species Sarcosuchus imperator in 1966.

Fossils from Brazil 
In 1977, a new species of Sarcosuchus was recognised, S. hartti, from remains found in the late 19th century in late Hauterivian pebbly conglomerates and green shales belonging to the Ilhas Group in the Recôncavo Basin of north-eastern Brazil. In 1867, American naturalist Charles Hartt found two isolated teeth and sent them to the American paleontologist O. C. Marsh who erected a new species of Crocodylus for them, C. hartti. This material, along with other remains were assigned in 1907 to the genus Goniopholis as G. hartti. Now residing in the British Museum of Natural History, the fragment of the lower jaw, dorsal scute and two teeth compromising the species G. hartti were reexamined and conclusively placed in the genus Sarcosuchus.

Recent findings 

The next major findings occurred during the expeditions led by the American paleontologist Paul Sereno in 1995 (Aoufous Formation, Morocco), 1997 and the follow-up trip in 2000. Partial skeletons, numerous skulls and 20 tons of assorted other fossils were recovered from the deposits of the Elrhaz Formation, which has been dated as late Aptian or early Albian stages of the Late Cretaceous. It took about a year to prepare the Sarcosuchus remains.

Fossils were found in 2010 in the Ifezouane Formation of Morocco. Fossil teeth from the area of Nalut in northwestern Libya, possibly Hauterivian to Barremian in age, might be referable to S. imperator. Indeterminate Sarcosuchus material including dorsal osteoderms in anatomical connection, isolated teeth and fragmentary skeletal remains including a left scapula, mandible fragment, dorsal vertebrae, ilium and a proximal portion of a femur was described from the Oum Ed Dhiab Member in Tunisia in 2018.

Paleobiology

Growth pattern 
Sereno took thin sections from trunk osteoderms of an estimated subadult individual (~80% of estimated maximum adult size). Approximately 40 lines of arrested growth (LAG) were counted in these thin sections, suggesting that S. imperator took 50 to 60 years to reach adult size. Given that extant wild crocodylians rarely reach these advanced ages, Sereno suggested that S. imperator achieved its large size by extending its period of rapid, juvenile, growth. A similar growth strategy has been suggested for the equally titanic crocodylian Deinosuchus, based on similar criteria.

Diet 
 
Based on the broader snout of fully grown S. imperator when compared with the living gharial and other narrow-snouted crocodiles, along with a lack of interlocking of the smooth and sturdy-crowned teeth when the jaws were closed, Sereno et al. hypothesized that S. imperator had a generalized diet similar to that of the Nile crocodile, which would have included large terrestrial prey such as the abundant dinosaurs that lived in the same region.

However, a 2014 analysis of a biomechanical model of its skull suggested that unlike Deinosuchus, Sarcosuchus may not have been able to perform the "death roll" maneuver used by extant crocodilians to dismember their prey. This suggests that if S. imperator did hunt big game, it probably did not dismember prey in the same fashion as extant crocodilians.

Habitat 
The remains of S. imperator were found in a region of the Ténéré Desert named Gadoufaoua, more specifically in the Elrhaz Formation of the Tegama Group, dating from the late Aptian to the early Albian of the Early Cretaceous, approximately 112 million years ago. The stratigraphy of the region and the aquatic fauna that was found therein indicates that it was an inland fluvial environment, entirely freshwater in nature with a humid tropical climate. S. imperator shared the waters with the holostean fish Lepidotus and the coelacanth Mawsonia. The dinosaur fauna was represented by the iguanodontian Lurdusaurus, which was the most common dinosaur in the region, and its relative Ouranosaurus; there were also two sauropods, Nigersaurus and a currently unnamed sauropod while the theropod fauna included the spinosaurid Suchomimus, the carcharodontosaurid Eocarcharia and the abelisaurid Kryptops.

Meanwhile, S. hartti was found in the Recôncavo Basin of Brazil, specifically in the Ilhas Formation of the Bahia series. It was a shallow lacustrine environment dating from the late Aptian, similar in age to the habitat of S. imperator, with similar aquatic fauna, including Lepidotus and two species of Mawsonia. The dinosaur fauna is of a very fragmentary nature and identification does not go beyond indeterminate theropod and iguanodontid remains.

References

Bibliography

External links 

 "African fossil find: 40-foot crocodile". Guy Gugliotta. Washington Post, October 26, 2001. Retrieved November 17, 2004.
 SuperCroc: Sarcosuchus imperator. Gabrielle Lyon. Retrieved November 17, 2004.
 "'SuperCroc' fossil found in Sahara". D. L. Parsell. National Geographic News, October 25, 2001. Retrieved November 17, 2004.
 Dinosaur Expedition 2000. Paul C. Sereno. Retrieved November 17, 2004.
 "SuperCroc's jaws were superstrong, study shows". John Roach. National Geographic News, April 4, 2003. Retrieved November 17, 2004.
 "Sereno, team discover prehistoric giant Sarcosuchus imperator in African desert." Steve Koppes. The University of Chicago Chronicle, volume 21, number 4, November 1, 2001. Retrieved November 17, 2004.
 Making of the Sarcosuchus exhibit

Neosuchians
Early Cretaceous crocodylomorphs of Africa
Fossils of Algeria
Fossils of Mali
Fossils of Morocco
Fossils of Niger
Fossils of Tunisia
Early Cretaceous crocodylomorphs of South America
Cretaceous Brazil
Fossils of Brazil
Fossil taxa described in 1966
Taxa named by Philippe Taquet
Prehistoric pseudosuchian genera